The Melbourne General Cemetery is a large (43 hectare) necropolis located  north of the city of Melbourne in the suburb of Carlton North.

The cemetery is notably the resting place of four Prime Ministers of Australia, more than any other necropolis within Australia. Former Prime Minister Harold Holt's headstone is a memorial, as his remains have never been discovered.

History
The cemetery was established in 1852 and opened on 1 June 1853, and the Old Melbourne Cemetery (on the site of what is now the Queen Victoria Market) was closed the next year.

The grounds feature several heritage buildings, many in bluestone, including a couple of chapels and a number of cast iron pavilions. The gatehouses are particularly notable.

Notable interments

Prime Ministers Garden
Five Prime Ministers of Australia are memorialised at Melbourne General Cemetery. Three are interred in the cemetery's 'Prime Ministers Garden': Sir Robert Menzies (including Dame Pattie Menzies), Sir John Gorton, and Malcolm Fraser. Harold Holt's (including his wife Dame Zara Bate) is a memorial, as his body was never recovered after he disappeared at sea. Dame Zara is buried at Sorrento Cemetery, the closest burial ground to where Holt disappeared.

James Scullin (including Sarah Scullin) is buried in the Catholic section of the cemetery.

State Premiers and Governors  
There are eight Premiers of Victoria buried in the Melbourne General Cemetery, more than any other necropolis around the state. Premiers George Elmslie, James Francis, Duncan Gillies, Richard Heales, William Nicholson, Sir John O'Shanassy, Sir James Patterson, and James Service. Sir Robert Menzies served as Deputy Premier of Victoria between 1932 and 1934.

The first Premier of Tasmania is interred at Melbourne General Cemetery, William Champ.

There is two Governor of Victoria, Sir Charles Hotham, and Sir James Gobbo one Governor-General of Australia, Sir Isaac Isaacs, buried at Melbourne General Cemetery.

War graves
The cemetery contains the war graves of 91 Commonwealth service personnel, more than 30 from World War I and more than 50 from World War II.

References

External links
 The Southern Metropolitan Cemeteries Trust: administrators of the Melbourne General Cemetery
 Melbourne General Cemetery: Melbourne General Cemetery website

Buildings and structures in the City of Melbourne (LGA)
History of Melbourne
Landmarks in Melbourne
Cemeteries in Melbourne
Tourist attractions in Melbourne
1852 establishments in Australia
Commonwealth War Graves Commission cemeteries in Australia
Heritage-listed buildings in Melbourne